Karla Bonoff (born December 27, 1951) is an American singer-songwriter. While Bonoff has released a number of albums, she is primarily known for her songwriting. Bonoff's songs include "Home," covered by Bonnie Raitt, "Tell Me Why" by Wynonna Judd, and "Isn't It Always Love" by Lynn Anderson.

Most notably, Linda Ronstadt recorded several Bonoff songs, including three tracks on the 1976 album Hasten Down the Wind ("Someone To Lay Down Beside Me", "Lose Again" and "If He's Ever Near"), which introduced Bonoff to a mass audience, and "All My Life", a 1989 duet with Ronstadt and Aaron Neville.

Life and career 
Bonoff was born to Chester and Shirley (nee Kahane) Bonoff, and named after her paternal grandfather Karl Bonoff. Her family was Jewish. Her paternal great-grandparents and one of her maternal great-grandfathers were immigrants from the Russian Empire. One of her mother's grandmothers was born in Pennsylvania to Hungarian Jewish parents, while her mother's other grandparents were born in Austria and Germany.

In her early career, Bonoff sang background vocals for Ronstadt and Wendy Waldman before releasing her debut album in 1977, titled Karla Bonoff. Her other albums include Restless Nights (1979), Wild Heart of the Young (1982), New World (1988) and All My Life (a greatest hits collection) in 1999. Bonoff is best known as a songwriter, but she is also noted for her hit recording of "Personally", which became a No. 19 hit on the Billboard Hot 100 as well as No. 3 on the Adult Contemporary chart in the middle of 1982. She also recorded "Somebody's Eyes" for the Footloose (1984) soundtrack and "Standing Right Next To Me" on the 8 Seconds (1994) soundtrack.

Bonoff's first live album was released in September 2007. This double CD includes many of her best-known songs performed live in concert on October 24, 2004, in Santa Barbara, California (except for one song recorded on July 30, 2005, in Japan). She was backed by her touring band, which includes the late Kenny Edwards (guitar, bass, mandolin, cello, vocals) and Nina Gerber (guitar) plus long-time associate Scott Babcock (drums and vocals).

Bonoff was also a member of the group Bryndle, which included Wendy Waldman and Kenny Edwards (who also produced Bonoff's first three albums). The band also included Andrew Gold until he left in 1996. The group first formed in the late 1960s, but did not release any albums until 20 years later with two studio albums and a live album between 1995 and 2002.

Karla Bonoff also appeared on the Keiko Matsui album titled 'Sapphire'.

Bonoff continues to tour throughout the US and Japan.

Discography

Studio albums

 Karla Bonoff (1977) (US #52)
 Restless Nights (1979)(US #31), (AUS #66)
 Wild Heart of the Young (1982) (US #49)
 New World (1988)
 Carry Me Home (2019)
 Silent Night (2020)

with Bryndle
 Bryndle (1995)
 House of Silence (2002)

Live albums
 Live (2007)

Compilations
 Premium Best (1988) [Japan Only]
 The Best of Karla Bonoff (1992) [Mail Order; Japan Only]
 All My Life: The Best of Karla Bonoff (1999)

Singles

References

External links
 Karla Bonoff's website

1951 births
Living people
University High School (Los Angeles) alumni
American women singer-songwriters
Singer-songwriters from California
People from Greater Los Angeles
American people of Hungarian-Jewish descent
American people of Russian-Jewish descent
American people of Austrian-Jewish descent
American people of German-Jewish descent
21st-century American women